At Duke University, the title of James B. Duke Professor is given to a small number of the faculty with extraordinary records of achievement. At some universities, titles like "distinguished professor", "institute professor", or "regents professor" are counterparts of this title. Two Nobel laureates currently serve as James B. Duke Professors.

Current James B. Duke Professors
 David Aers — English and historical theology
 Hashim M. Al-Hashimi — biochemistry
 Dan Ariely — behavioral economics
 Vann Bennett — cell biology, biochemistry, neurobiology
 Lorena Beese — biochemistry
 Richard Brennan — biochemistry
 Allen Buchanan — public policy
 Linda Burton — sociology
 Blanche Capel — cell biology
 Marc Caron — cell biology
 Patrick J. Casey — pharmacology and cancer biology
 Bryan Cullen — virology
 Bruce Donald — Computer Science and Biochemistry
 Rick Durrett — mathematics
 Victor Dzau — medicine
 Harold P. Erickson — cell biology
 Owen Flanagan — philosophy
 Alan Enoch Gelfand — statistics and decision sciences
 Joseph C. Greenfield — medicine
 —literature, art, art history and visual studies 
 Joseph Heitman — molecular genetics, microbiology, microbial pathogenesis, and mycology
 Homme Hellinga — biochemistry
 Karla Holloway — English, law and African American Studies
 Donald L. Horowitz — law and political science
 Jerry Hough — political science
 Jack D. Keene - RNA biology
 Garnett H. Kelsoe — immunology
 Robert Keohane — political science
 Sally Kornbluth — pharmacology
 Rachel Kranton — Economics
 Robert Lefkowitz — biochemistry
 Kam W. Leong — biomedical engineering
 Daniel J. Lew — pharmacology and cancer biology
 Douglas Marchuk — genetics and microbiology
 Paul L. Modrich — biochemistry
 Toril Moi — literature
 Berndt Mueller — physics
 John R. Perfect — medicine
Kenneth D. Poss — cell biology
 Anne E. Pusey — evolutionary anthropology
 Jane S. Richardson — biochemistry
 Guillermo Sapiro - Electrical Engineering
 David G Schaeffer - mathematics
 David Smith, Electrical Engineering
 Ralph Snyderman — medicine
 J. E. R. Staddon — psychology
 Steven Vogel — biology
 Warren S. Warren — chemistry
 Robert Winkler — decision sciences
 Ingrid Daubechies — mathematics

James B. Duke Professors Emeriti
 Orrin H. Pilkey — Earth sciences

Former James B. Duke Professors
 Robert Behringer  - physics
 Ralph J. Braibanti — political science
 Louis J. Budd — English literature
 Leonard Carlitz — mathematics
 John Shelton Curtiss — history
Wallace Fowlie — French literature
 John Hope Franklin — history
 Craufurd Goodwin — economics
 Allen C. Kelley — economics
 Paul J. Kramer — biology
 Sarah H. Lisanby — medicine
 David R. Morrison — mathematics
 Reynolds Price — English literature
 Knut Schmidt-Nielsen — biology
 Joseph J. Spengler — economics
 Lionel Stevenson — English literature

References